Breakout is a 1970 American TV film which broadcast on NBC.

Cast
James Drury as Joe Baker
Red Buttons as Pipes
Kathryn Hays as Ann Baker
Woody Strode as Skip Manion

References

External links
 

1970 television films
1970 films
NBC network original films